Mean deviation may refer to:

Statistics
 Mean signed deviation, a measure of central tendency
 Mean absolute deviation, a measure of statistical dispersion
 Mean squared deviation, another measure of statistical dispersion

Other
 Mean Deviation (book), a 2010 non-fiction book by former Metal Maniacs magazine editor Jeff Wagner

See also
 Deviation (statistics)
 Mean difference (disambiguation)